Centrocerum elegans is a species of longhorn beetles (insects in the family Cerambycidae). It was described by Chevrolat in 1861. The species has a South American distribution and is found in Brazil, Bolivia, Paraguay and Argentina.

References

External links 
 Picture at ipmimages.org
 Centrocerum elegans at insectoid.info

Elaphidiini
Beetles described in 1861
Insects of South America